Kim Jong-in (born January 14, 1994), better known as Kai, is a South Korean singer, model, actor, and dancer. He is a member of the South Korean-Chinese boy group Exo, its sub unit Exo-K, and South Korean supergroup SuperM. He debuted as a soloist in November 2020 with the release of his extended-play, Kai. Apart from his musical career, Kai has also starred in various television dramas such as Choco Bank (2016), Andante (2017), and Spring Has Come (2018). Kai is widely considered to be one of the best dancers of South Korea and K-pop, and is among the most influential Korean fashion icons.

Early life 
Kai was born on January 14, 1994, in Suncheon, South Jeolla Province, South Korea, as the youngest member of his family, with two older sisters. Despite his parents initially wanting him to learn Taekwondo and the piano, Kai began to train in ballet while in third grade after watching The Nutcracker, and started jazz dancing when he was eight years old in the fourth grade of elementary school. His father, now deceased, was the most important benefactor of his encounter with dance, which was of great significance to his life, according to a film about his growth story featured in Gucci's 2019 project "The Performers". Kai attended high school at School of Performing Arts Seoul, where he graduated from in 2012.

Career

2011–15: Debut and career beginnings

In 2007, encouraged by his father, Kai participated in and won SM Entertainment's Youth Best Contest and signed with the company at the age of thirteen years old. He then began training in hip-hop dance. On December 23, 2011, SM announced Kai as the first member of the company's upcoming boy group, Exo. He made his first televised performance alongside fellow Exo members Luhan, Chen and Tao as well as other SM artists at the year-end music program SBS Gayo Daejeon on December 29, 2011. The group officially debuted in April 2012 and has since gained significant popularity and commercial success.

In October 2012, Kai participated in the promotional group Younique Unit alongside labelmates Eunhyuk, Henry, Hyoyeon, Taemin and Luhan. The group released a single titled "Maxstep" as part of the collaboration between SM Entertainment and Hyundai. Later in December 2012, he joined the dance group SM The Performance, along with fellow member Lay, TVXQ's Yunho, Super Junior's Eunhyuk and Donghae, Shinee's Minho and Taemin. The group first made its appearance at the event SBS Gayo Daejeon on December 29, and performed their single "Spectrum". The single was officially released the next day. In August 2014, Kai was featured in the song "Pretty Boy" from Shinee member Taemin's debut album.

2016–2019: Acting career and SuperM

In January 2016, Kai made his acting debut as the male lead in the web drama Choco Bank, which achieved record-breaking viewership. In December 2016, he starred in two episodes of the special web drama 7 First Kisses which was produced by Lotte Duty Free.

In January 2017, Kai was announced to be starring as the male lead in the KBS teen drama Andante, playing a high school student. In February 2017, he was cast in the Japanese drama Spring Has Come, based on the Japanese novel of the same name. The drama marks the first time a non-Japanese actor taking a lead role on a drama produced by the broadcasting station Wowow.

In December 2017, Kai was chosen as the cover model for December's issue of The Big Issue, a magazine known for helping the homeless. The magazine sold out 20,000 copies within the first two days, and until now, 80,000 copies have been sold, which records the highest number of copies sold since the magazine's start in July 2010. In 2018, Kai was cast in KBS' melodrama The Miracle We Met.

On August 7, 2019, Kai was confirmed to be a member of SuperM, a "K-pop supergroup" created by SM Entertainment in collaboration with Capitol Records. The group's promotions are scheduled to begin in October and are aimed at the American market. Kai has been selected as the first Gucci Eyewear Men Global Ambassador in Korea. SuperM debuted with the group's self-titled debut EP on October 4, 2019.

2020–present: Solo debut
On July 3, 2020, SM Entertainment announced that Kai's first solo album was currently under production with the goal of being released in the second half of 2020. On October 12, he was announced to have become the first ever male muse of the cosmetics brand Bobbi Brown.

On November 30, 2020, Kai released his debut extended play Kai and its lead single "Mmmh". The album peaked at number 2 on the Gaon Album Chart and has been certified Platinum by the KMCA.

On November 30, 2021, Kai released his second extended play Peaches and its lead single of the same name. The album peaked at number 3 on the Gaon Album Chart and has also been certified Platinum.

In February 2023, SM confirmed that Kai plans to release a new solo album Rover on March 13. On March 13, Kai released his third extended play Rover and its lead single of the same name.

Entertainments
On March, 2020, Kai became the ambassador for the Italian high-end luxury fashion house Gucci with the Chinese actress Nini. Later that year Kai became the first male Muse for Bobbi Brown Cosmetics. On September 14, 2021, the city of Seoul announced that they selected Kai as the face of the brand and a global ambassador for Seoul Fashion Week Spring 2022. On November 1, Kai appeared in the online showcase "TUCSON Beyond Drive", a collaboration between Hyundai Motors and SM Entertainment, where he presented a music performance titled "Follow Your Hidden Light" that combines K-pop and AR technology.

In January 2022, Charmzone Mask selected Kai as their new model, "hoping that it will deliver a youthful and trendy image of Charmzone's premium mask products." BlackYak Climbing Crew selected kai as model for The Black Yak BCC collection. Later that year Kai became the muse for Yves Saint Laurent Beauty.

Discography

Extended plays

Singles

Other appearances

Songwriting credits
All credits are adapted from the Korea Music Copyright Association, unless stated otherwise.

Filmography

Television series

Web series

Television shows

Web shows

Music videos

Concerts

Headlining tour

Online concert
 Kai : KLoor (Beyond LIVE #Cinema) (2021)

Awards and nominations

Notes

References

External links

 
 
 
 

Exo members
SuperM members
1994 births
People from Suncheon
South Korean male singers
South Korean male television actors
School of Performing Arts Seoul alumni
K-pop singers
South Korean pop singers
South Korean contemporary R&B singers
South Korean dance music singers
South Korean electronic music singers
South Korean mandopop singers
Mandarin-language singers of South Korea
South Korean male idols
South Korean male ballet dancers
South Korean male dancers
South Korean dance musicians
South Korean male web series actors
Living people
21st-century South Korean singers
Japanese-language singers of South Korea
SM Entertainment artists